The 1950 Singapore Open, also known as the 1950 Singapore Badminton Championships, took place from 26 August 1950 – 20 January 1951 at the Clerical Union Hall in Balestier, Singapore. The ties were played over a few months with the first round ties being played on the 26 of August and last (the men's doubles final) was played on the 20th of January 1951.

Venue
Clerical Union Hall

Final results

References 

Singapore Open (badminton)
1950 in badminton